Abderrahmane Meziane Bentahar (born March 7, 1994) is an Algerian footballer who plays as a striker for USM Alger in the Algerian Ligue Professionnelle 1.

Club career

USM Alger 
In 2011 Abderrahmane Meziane joined the USM Alger Academy, coming from the FAF Academy. Where he achieved with them two titles for the Ligue Professionnelle 1Meziane U21 season 2012–13 and 2013–14 and one in the cup with U17 in 2011 against USM Blida and scored a goal in a match. the first official game with the first team was in the 2013-14 season in the Ligue Professionnelle 1 against JSM Béjaïa and participated in just one minute as a substitute in the place of Mokhtar Benmoussa, In the following season, Meziane was promoted to the first team and played eight games and scored a single goal against JS Saoura in the Ligue ProfessionnelMezianele 1. On July 8, 2015, Meziane moved on loan for one season to RC Arbaâ in order to get a chance to play more, and he greatly excelled, which made him return to USM Alger strongly, and in the first season after his return Meziane won his first title in his football career by winning the Super Cup. As for the Ligue Professionnelle 1 Meziane was the second best scorer with eight goals equal with Oussama Darfalou. On June 21, 2017, Meziane scored his first goal in The CAF Champions League against Zamalek in 2–0 victory. In his last season Meziane won the Ligue Professionnelle 1 title for the first time and in the final round against CS Constantine where he scored a goal in 3–1 victory to guarantee the title.

The first foreign experiment 
On June 13, 2019, Meziane signed his first foreign contract for four seasons with the Emiratis of Al Ain. and his first match was in the UAE League Cup against Shabab Al Ahli which ended in a 2–2 draw. after which Meziane suffered a knee injury that kept him out for more than a month. On December 15, Meziane scored his first goal against Ajman in 4–1 victory. On January 18, 2020, Meziane signed three and a half seasons in Espérance de Tunis for a million and a half dollars. and the first match was in the Ligue 1 against CS Hammam-Lif, after a stop for five months due to the COVID-19 pandemic in Tunisia football competitions are back again, On August 22, 2020, Meziane scored his first goal against Stade Tunisien to end the season with two titles the Ligue Professionnelle 1 and the Super Cup. In the second season it was expected that Meziane would have exploded all his capabilities, but due to injuries and the coach's lack of confidence in him, Espérance de Tunis administration decided to offer him for sale, but no club submitted to contract with him and at the end of the season Meziane was officially dismissed.

USM Alger back again 
On August 21, 2021, Meziane signed a two-year contract with USM Alger and after great negotiations about the salary, they agreed for 260 million per month.

International career
In 2015, Meziane was part of the Algeria under-23 national team at the 2015 U-23 Africa Cup of Nations in Senegal. where he participated in all matches and lead the National team to the Football at the 2016 Summer Olympics for the first time in 36 years, Meziane was named in the squad for the 2016 Summer Olympics. In the first match against Honduras, he took part as a substitute for Mohamed Benkablia, and in the following matches against Argentina he participated as a substitute again, and this time in the place of Zakaria Haddouche, in the last game against Portugal and after the national team was eliminated, Meziane participated in the entire 90 minutes. in 2017 Meziane calls for the first time for the Algeria A' national team in the 2018 CHAN qualification against Libya.

Career statistics

Club

Honours

Club
 USM Alger
 Algerian Ligue Professionnelle 1 (1): 2018–19
 Algerian Super Cup (1): 2016

 Espérance de Tunis
 Tunisian Ligue Professionnelle 1 (2): 2019–20, 2020–21
 Tunisian Super Cup (1): 2020

References

External links
 
 

Living people
1994 births
Algerian footballers
Algerian expatriate footballers
Association football forwards
USM Alger players
RC Arbaâ players
Al Ain FC players
Espérance Sportive de Tunis players
Algeria youth international footballers
Algerian Ligue Professionnelle 1 players
UAE Pro League players
Tunisian Ligue Professionnelle 1 players
People from Médéa
Footballers at the 2016 Summer Olympics
Olympic footballers of Algeria
Expatriate footballers in the United Arab Emirates
Expatriate footballers in Tunisia
Algerian expatriate sportspeople in the United Arab Emirates
Algerian expatriate sportspeople in Tunisia
Algeria international footballers
21st-century Algerian people
Algeria A' international footballers
2022 African Nations Championship players